Lianhua Symphony (also known as Symphony of Lianhua) is a 1937 Chinese anthology film. Produced by Lianhua Film Company, it served as a showcase of the studio's possibilities. It consists of eight segments of various duration and genre, directed by eight prominent directors of the era: Cai Chusheng, Fei Mu, He Mengfu, Situ Huimin, Shen Fu, Sun Yu, Tan Youliu, and Zhu Shilin.

Production overview
Lianhua Film Company was the biggest film company of China in the 1930s. Eight young directors chosen to participate in the project were already praised for their previous works. Most of them became even more important several years later and today their films are considered classics. Some, like Sun Yu's The Big Road (1934), Cai Chusheng's The Spring River Flows East (1947), Fei Mu's Spring in a Small Town (1948), or Shen Fu's Myriad of Lights (1949) often reappear on many "best Chinese films of all time" lists. Zhu Shilin became a prominent figure in Hong Kong cinema of the 1950s. In this respect, today Lianhua Symphony can be considered an overview of short films created by the most important directors of the so-called "first generation" of Chinese filmmakers.

Lianhua Symphony episodes differ in content and style. The main themes are poverty, social patriotism, friendship. Many segments refer, either directly or indirectly, to Japanese threat of the time. Some may be classified as melodramas and some as comedies, including elements of slapstick. Fei Mu's segment about women having bad dreams, Nightmares in Spring Chamber, is clearly and heavily influenced by German Expressionist cinema.

The film begins with a short introduction sequence, in which Lianhua Film Company personnel sings Song of Big Road, a hit from one of the studio's previous films, The Big Road (1934). Camera zooms out to reveal a microphone, film equipment and a conductor. The film finishes with a similar scene, presenting a different song, The Pioneers. This reminds us, that Lianhua was not only a prolific manufacturer of movies, but also - music.

Segments

References

External links

 Nightmares in Spring Chamber segment at the Chinese Movie Database

1937 films
Chinese black-and-white films
Films directed by Fei Mu
Lianhua Film Company films
Films set in Shanghai
Chinese anthology films
Chinese comedy-drama films
1937 comedy-drama films